Elbingerode is a municipality in the district of Göttingen, in Lower Saxony, Germany.

Geography

Geographical location 
Elbingerode is in the Harz National Park near the Sieber river. Elbingerode belongs to the municipality of Hattorf am Harz. The village is in the immediate proximity of Bundesstraße 27, which results from Göttingen to Blankenburg.

References